The Braithwaite House is a historic house at Bella Vista Drive and Braithwaite Street in Bentonville, Arkansas.  Built , this single-story brick house may be the oldest house in Benton County, and is the only one of its type in the city.  Its form is similar to a saltbox with a side gable roof that has a short front slope and an extended rear slope.  An open porch with a shed roof extends across the front.  The house was by James Haney, an Irish brick mason, for the Braithwaites, who were major local landowners.

The house was listed on the National Register of Historic Places in 1988.

See also
National Register of Historic Places listings in Benton County, Arkansas

References

Houses on the National Register of Historic Places in Arkansas
Houses completed in 1885
Houses in Bentonville, Arkansas
National Register of Historic Places in Bentonville, Arkansas
Saltbox architecture in the United States
1885 establishments in Arkansas